Val Rita-Harty is a township municipality in Cochrane District in Northeastern Ontario, Canada.

The township consists of two communities, Val Rita and Harty, both located along Highway 11 between Opasatika and Kapuskasing. It was incorporated as a township in 1973, following a failed community effort in 1964 to request incorporation as a municipality.

Demographics 

Population:
 Population in 2016: 762 (-6.7% from 2011)
 Population in 2011: 817 (-13.0% from 2006)
 Population in 2006: 939 (-8.1% from 2001)
 Population in 2001: 1,012 (-9.0% from 1996)
 Population in 1996: 1,112
 Population in 1991: 1,178

Mother tongue:
 English as first language: 22.2%
 French as first language: 74.5%
 English and French as first language: 1.3%
 Other as first language: 2%

See also
List of townships in Ontario
List of francophone communities in Ontario

References

External links

Municipalities in Cochrane District
Single-tier municipalities in Ontario
Township municipalities in Ontario